Taiyou no Toriko (Japanese: 太陽の虜, lit. Prisoner of the Sun) is the debut EP by Japanese rock band Fanatic Crisis. This album has two editions. The first edition features six tracks and was released by the independent label Noir on December 1, 1994. The second edition features three additional tracks (one new song, an instrumental interlude, and a remixed version of Pacifist) and was released on April 28, 1995.

Track listing

Personnel 
Tsutomu Ishizuki − vocals
Kazuya − lead guitar
Shun − rhythm guitar
Ryuji − bass
Tatsuya − drums

References

Fanatic Crisis albums
1995 debut albums